Tõnu Talbak (20 June 1888 Kolga Parish, Harju County - ?) was an Estonian politician. He was a member of Estonian Constituent Assembly. He was a member of the assembly since 23 April 1919. He replaced Jaan Letner. On 25 October 1919, he resigned his position and he was replaced by Jakob Puss.

References

1888 births
Members of the Estonian Constituent Assembly
Year of death missing